Markus Holton Lauridsen (born 28 February 1991) is a Danish professional ice hockey defenseman who currently plays for the Malmö Redhawks of the Swedish Hockey League (SHL). He is the younger brother to Oliver Lauridsen, who is also a teammate at the Redhawks.

Playing career
Lauridsen originally played in his native Denmark with his hometown lower division club IC Gentofte before moving to join the Swedish youth team of Linköping HC. After one season in the J20 SuperElit in 2008–09, and with NHL aspirations, Lauridsen moved to North America to participate in a junior career in the United States Hockey League with the Green Bay Gamblers. Undrafted, Lauridsen was an overage player in his second season with the Gamblers in 2011–12, posting 30 points in 58 games.

On the back of helping Green Bay capture the Clark Cup Championship, Lauridsen accepted an invite to join the Colorado Avalanche 2012 training camp on 22 August 2012. With the NHL lockout cancelling Colorado's training camp, Lauridsen was assigned to participate in the training camp of Avalanche AHL affiliate, the Lake Erie Monsters. Signed to an AHL contract with the Monsters, Lauridsen was then reassigned to begin his professional career in the 2012–13 season, with inaugural Central Hockey League affiliate, the Denver Cutthroats.

Lauridsen scored his first professional goal in his first game at the Cutthroats season opener on 19 October 2012. He posted 15 points in leading the Cutthroats defense before he received a second recall to remain with the Lake Erie Monsters, finishing with 12 assists in 36 games. Towards the completion of his first professional year, Lauridsen was signed to a two-year entry level contract with the Avalanche.

After three years within the Colorado Avalanche organization and being unable to reach the NHL, Lauridsen signed as an impending restricted free agent to a one-year deal with Swedish second-tier club, AIK IF of the HockeyAllsvenskan on 16 June 2015. In the 2015–16 season with AIK, Lauridsen cemented a role on the blueline, contributing with 21 points in 50 games and was instrumental in helping the club compete in the playoffs for promotion to the SHL.

On 14 April 2016, Lauridsen left AIK to sign a lucrative two-year contract with top-tier SHL club, Leksands IF. He left the team after the conclusion of the 2016–17 season and inked a deal with German Deutsche Eishockey Liga side EHC München in May 2017.

Lauridsen played a lone season in Germany, appearing in 32 regular season games for 7 points before helping EHC München to their third straight championship in the post-season. On 30 April 2018, Lauridsen opted to return to the SHL, signing a two-year contract with HV71. Following two seasons with HV71, Lauridsen moved to his third SHL club, in agreeing to a two-year contract with the Malmö Redhawks, on 30 March 2020.

Following 33 points in 74 games for the team in his first two seasons, and a combined plus-minus of +10, Malmö Redhawks announced on the 5th of April 2022 that they had signed Lauridsen to a 2-year contract extension, keeping him at the club over the 2023-24 season.

International play

Lauridsen has been an established member of the Danish junior team, competing in various World U18 Championships and World Junior Championships. In the 2010 Championship, Lauridsen was named as the Division I Best Defenseman for the tournament and repeated his performance the following 2011 Championship to lead all defenseman in points.

After the completion of his first professional season, Lauridsen was named to the Danish squad to make his senior debut at the 2013 World Championships in Sweden. He played his first full international in an opening game defeat to Canada on 4 May 2013. Playing alongside brother Oliver, he appeared in every game for Denmark to finish with one assist in 7 games to help avoid relegation and finish in 12th place.

Career statistics

Regular season and playoffs

International

References

External links
 

1991 births
Living people
AIK IF players
Danish ice hockey defencemen
Denver Cutthroats players
Green Bay Gamblers players
HV71 players
Lake Erie Monsters players
Leksands IF players
Malmö Redhawks players
EHC München players
People from Gentofte Municipality
Ice hockey players at the 2022 Winter Olympics
Olympic ice hockey players of Denmark
Sportspeople from the Capital Region of Denmark